Marco Tulio Boasso (born in 1962 in Montevideo, Uruguay) served as the International Organization for Migration's (IOM) Special Envoy and Chief of Mission in Afghanistan. He was appointed to this position by the IOM Director General in March 2009.

Biography
A veteran in the IOM system, Boasso has held a variety of positions within the organization. Prior to his appointment as Special Envoy and Chief of Mission in Afghanistan, he headed the Emergency and Post-Crises Division at the IOM Headquarters in Geneva between 2002 and 2009.

His other posts at IOM include Deputy Regional Representative for Central America and the Caribbean-based out of Costa Rica between 1999 and 2001;

His additional roles have included being appointed IOM’s Special Envoy to establish IOM offices in Darfur and Sudan for the return and reintegration of refugees and internally displaced people; leading negotiations between IOM and the Kurdish government for the establishment of IOM offices in Irbil, northern Iraq to assist the safe and dignified return of undocumented migrants; representing IOM on the Interagency Unit for Displacement established by the UN Office for the Coordination of Humanitarian Affairs (OCHA); and managing the design and implementation of operations to evacuate third country migrant workers in the context of Ivory Coast’s humanitarian crisis.

References

1962 births
Uruguayan diplomats
Living people